American Ice Company Baltimore Plant No. 2 is a historic ice manufacturing plant located at Baltimore, Maryland, United States. It consists of two industrial buildings: an original two story stone ice manufacturing building built in 1905 and a brick ice storage addition, built in 1919, is an immense, nearly windowless structure with the height of a six-story building.

American Ice Company Baltimore Plant No. 2 was listed on the National Register of Historic Places in 2002.

See also
American Ice Company
 List of ice companies

References

External links
, including photo from 2002, at Maryland Historical Trust

Buildings and structures in Baltimore
Industrial buildings completed in 1905
Industrial buildings and structures on the National Register of Historic Places in Baltimore
Remington, Baltimore
Ice trade
Ice companies
1905 establishments in Maryland